The 2010 European Short Track Speed Skating Championships took place between 22 and 24 January 2010 in Dresden, Germany.

Medal summary

Medal table

Men's events

Women's events

Participating nations

See also
Short track speed skating
European Short Track Speed Skating Championships

External links
Detailed results
Results overview
Results book

European Short Track Speed Skating Championships
European Short Track Speed Skating Championships
European
European Short Track Speed Skating Championships
International speed skating competitions hosted by Germany
Sport in Dresden